Following the reapportionment resulting from the 1830 census, Pennsylvania gained two representatives, increasing from 26 to 28, and was redistricted into 25 districts, two of which were plural districts.  Pennsylvania elected its members October 9, 1832.

See also 
 1832 Pennsylvania's 9th congressional district special election
 1833 Pennsylvania's 1st congressional district special election
 1832 and 1833 United States House of Representatives elections
 List of United States representatives from Pennsylvania

Notes

References 

1832
Pennsylvania
United States House of Representatives